Nicolae Rosetti-Bălănescu (6 December 1827 – 11 May 1884) was a lawyer and Romanian politician who served as the Minister of Foreign Affairs of Principality of Romania from 29 August 1863 until 29 October 1865.

Rosetti-Bălănescu was born in Iași, Moldavia. He came from a larger aristocratic Rosetti family, which to distinguish themselves split into four smaller families: Rosetti-Solescu, Rosetti-Roznovanu, Rosetti-Tescanu and Rosetti-Bălănescu. He studied in Paris at Lycée Henri-IV and then at the Paris Law Faculty, after which he returned to Romania.  His wife, Olga, divorced him and then  married another diplomat, Petre Mavrogheni. Towards the end of his life he went back to Paris, where he died. He is buried at Montparnasse Cemetery in Paris.

See also
Foreign relations of Romania

References

1827 births
1884 deaths
Politicians from Iași
Nicolae Rosetti-Bălănescu
Romanian Ministers of Foreign Affairs
Romanian Ministers of Control
Romanian Ministers of Finance
Lycée Henri-IV alumni
University of Paris alumni
Romanian expatriates in France
Burials at Montparnasse Cemetery